Luiz Filipe dos Reis Silva (born 28 May 2001), commonly known as Luiz Filipe, is a Brazilian professional footballer who plays as a forward for Série A side Goiás, on loan from Atlético Mineiro.

Club career 
Born in Carmésia, Luiz Filipe began his career at Atlético Mineiro and made his professional debut for the club on 26 June 2021, after coming on in the 69th minute for Keno in their 2–0 loss to Santos in the Campeonato Brasileiro Série A.

On 4 April 2022, Luiz Filipe joined Goiás on loan for the remainder of the season.

Career statistics

Honours 

 Atlético Mineiro
 Campeonato Brasileiro Série A: 2021
 Copa do Brasil: 2021
 Campeonato Mineiro: 2021, 2022
 Supercopa do Brasil: 2022
 Campeonato Brasileiro Sub-20: 2020

References

External links 
 
 

Living people
2001 births
Brazilian footballers
Association football forwards
Clube Atlético Mineiro players
Goiás Esporte Clube players
Campeonato Brasileiro Série A players